One for All World Tour is the ninth concert tour by the Bee Gees in support of their eighteenth studio album One. The tour began on 10 April 1989 in Tokyo, Japan and ended on 7 December 1989 in Matsuyama, Japan.

Background
In early 1988, the Bee Gees began recording One as their studio album after E.S.P. They stopped recording due to the death of their younger brother Andy Gibb on 10 March 1988. They continued recording in Mayfair Studios from November to December 1988 and February to March 1989. Just after they released their album, the brothers began touring in Japan, Europe, North America, Oceania and back to Japan. The full concert at the National Tennis Centre in Melbourne, Australia in November 1989 was released as a concert video entitled One for All Tour on 10 April 1991. During the DVD era, it was re-released as The Very Best of The Bee Gees Live! in 1997.

Set List
"Ordinary Lives"
"Giving up the Ghost"
"To Love Somebody"
"I've Gotta Get a Message to You"
"One"
"Tokyo Nights"
"Words"
"Juliet"
First Medley: "New York Mining Disaster 1941", "Holiday", "Too Much Heaven"
Second Medley: "Heartbreaker", "Islands in the Stream"
Third Medley: "Run to Me", "Melody Fair" (Only performed in Yokohama), "World"
"Spicks and Specks" (Only performed in Oceania)
"Lonely Days"
"How Deep Is Your Love"
"It's My Neighborhood"
"How Can You Mend a Broken Heart"
"House of Shame"
"I Started a Joke"
"Massachusetts"
"Stayin' Alive"
"Nights on Broadway"
"Jive Talkin'"
"You Win Again"
"You Should Be Dancing"

Tour dates

Tour band

Barry Gibb – vocals, guitar
Robin Gibb – vocals
Maurice Gibb – vocals, keyboards, bass, guitar
Alan Kendall – lead guitar
Tim Cansfield – guitar
Vic Martin – keyboards, synthesizer
Gary Moberly – keyboards, synthesizer
George Perry – bass
Chester Thompson – drums (until St. Paul, Minnesota)
Mike Murphy – drums (from Minnesota onwards)
Tampa Lann, Linda Harmon, and Phyllis St. James – background vocals, percussions

References
"The Bee Gees bringing back classic 1989 'One For All' tour live concert on video early in 2018" AXS

1989 concert tours
Bee Gees concert tours